1992 Belarusian First League was the first season of 2nd level football championship in Belarus. It started in April and ended in June 1992.

Teams

The first teams to participate in the Belarusian 2nd level football league were five teams formerly of Belarusian SSR Top League, ten teams from Belarusian SSR First League and the Dinamo Minsk reserve team which previously played in the Soviet Top League reserve teams' championship.

League table

Play-offs

Top goalscorers

See also
1992 Belarusian Premier League
1992 Belarusian Cup

External links
RSSSF

Belarusian First League seasons
2
Belarus